Alvaro Thomaz, Alvarus Thomaz, or Álvaro Tomás (fl. 1500–1521) was a Portuguese mathematician in the tradition of calculatores. He is known from his book Liber de triplici motu proportionibus annexis magistri published in 1509 which examined the work of the Merton College calculators of England.

Thomaz was born in Lisbon studied and taught in the University of Paris between 1510 and 1521. He also studied medicine and obtained a doctorate in 1518. He was a contemporary of Juan de Celaya at the College of Coqueret. His 1509 book offered a mathematical background to understand the Calculationes of Richard Swineshead. It includes studies of infinite series, examinations of the physics of motion. He was aware of the works of Nicomachus, Boethius, Johannes Campanus, Jordanus de Nemore, Euclid, Thomas Aquinas, Robert Holkot, Duns Scotus, Albert of Saxony, Marsilius of Inghen, Gregory of Rimini, John Maior, Paul of Venice, James of Forli, Cajetan of Thiene, John de Casali, Andrew de Novo Castro, Peter of Mantua, and Pietro d’Abano. Little is known of his life and nothing after 1521.

References

External links 
 Liber de triplici motu (1509)

16th-century Portuguese mathematicians